The 2017 United States Men's Curling Championship was held from February 11 to 18 at the Xfinity Arena in Everett, Washington. It was held in conjunction with the 2017 United States Women's Curling Championship.

Teams 
Ten teams qualified to participate in the 2017 national championship.

Round-robin standings 
Final round-robin standings

Round-robin results 
All draw times are listed in Central Standard Time.

Draw 1 
Saturday, February 11, 8:00pm

Draw 2 
Sunday, February 12, 12:00pm

Draw 3 
Sunday, February 12, 8:00pm

Draw 4 
Monday, February 13, 2:00pm

Draw 5 
Tuesday, February 14, 8:00am

Draw 6 
Tuesday, February 14, 4:00pm

Draw 7 
Wednesday, February 15, 9:00am

Draw 8 
Wednesday, February 15, 7:00pm

Draw 9 
Thursday, February 16, 12:00pm

Tiebreaker 
Thursday, February 16, 8:00pm

Playoffs

1 vs. 2 
Friday, February 17, 9:00am PT

3 vs. 4 
Friday, February 17, 9:00am PT

Semifinal 
Friday, February 17, 7:00pm PT

Final 
Saturday, February 18, 3:00 pm PT

References

External links 

 Curling Zone Main Page for 2017 USA Men's Curling Championship

United States Men's Curling Championship
Curling in Washington (state)
United States National Curling Championships
Curling Men's Championship
Curling United States Men's Championship